is a passenger railway station located in the city of Machida, Tokyo, Japan, operated by the private railway operator Tokyu Corporation.

Lines

Only "Local" and "Semi-express" services stop at this station.

Station layout
The station has two opposed side platforms serving two tracks, with an elevated station building located above and perpendicular to the platforms.

Platforms

History
Tsukushino Station opened on 1 April 1968.

Passenger statistics
In fiscal 2019, the station was used by an average of 11,544 passengers daily.

The passenger figures for previous years are as shown below.

Surrounding area
 Machida Tsukushino Elementary School

See also
List of railway stations in Japan

References

External links

 Tsukushino Station information (Tokyu) 

Tokyu Den-en-toshi Line
Stations of Tokyu Corporation
Railway stations in Tokyo
Railway stations in Japan opened in 1968
Machida, Tokyo